1-Hydroxypyrene is a human metabolite. It can be found in urine of outdoor workers exposed to air pollution.

Biochemistry 
Experiments in pig show that urinary 1-hydroxypyrene is a metabolite of pyrene, when given orally.

A Mycobacterium sp. strain isolated from mangrove sediments produced 1-hydroxypyrene during the degradation of pyrene.

Relationship with smoking 
Highly significant differences and dose-response relationships with regard to cigarettes smoked per day were found for 2-, 3- and 4-hydroxyphenanthrene and 1-hydroxypyrene, but not for 1-hydroxyphenanthrene.

References 

Human metabolites
Air pollution
Recreational drug metabolites
Smoking
Pyrenes
Hydroxyarenes